Glasshoughton railway station serves Glasshoughton, Castleford in West Yorkshire, England.

It was opened by West Yorkshire Metro on 21 February 2005. It is located near to the Xscape indoor ski slope and leisure complex near Castleford, all of which occupy the former site of Glasshoughton Colliery which ceased winding coal in 1986.

Demand for the new station was seriously under-estimated by Metro. For example, passenger journeys in 2008/09 were forecast to be 50,989 but were actually 135,279. This was chiefly because usage was modelled on the basis of demand for travel by current local residents and businesses only. No attempt was made to estimate possible travel to the station for local retail and leisure attractions, nor possible travel by people driving to the 100-space car park on a park and ride basis, e.g. from the nearby M62. Demand from future residential developments at Glasshoughton was also ignored.

Facilities
The station is unstaffed and has no ticketing facilities – passengers must buy their tickets in advance, on the train or at their destination (if available).  It has waiting shelters, customer help points, timetable poster boards and digital CIS displays on each platform and an automatic announcement system to offer train running information.  Step-free access is available to both platforms via ramps from the footbridge, which connects to the car park and station entrance.

Services
There is an hourly service to Leeds and Knottingley Monday through Saturday (plus one single afternoon service through to ), and a service every two hours in each direction on Sunday.

References

External links

Railway stations in Wakefield
Railway stations opened by Network Rail
Railway stations in Great Britain opened in 2005
Northern franchise railway stations
Castleford